James Baird (30 November 1828 – 30 May 1915) was Scottish born and came to Newfoundland at 16 and soon established himself as a prominent merchant.
Baird, a brother, and later a nephew built up a business which included a large array of general merchandise and eventually branched into the fishery supply business. He was an early steam yacht owner: GRIFFIN was built in 1865 for him by Aitken & Mansel, Whiteinch, Glasgow, Scotland. By the mid-1880s, they had entered the fish export trade and survived both the St. John's fire in 1892 and the banking collapse a few years later. He was highly important in the founding and supporting of many industries.

Baird, despite his high profile and important business career, is best known in Newfoundland history for the famous Baird et al. v. Walker case. It was a dispute over the location and operation of a lobster factory on land deemed to be assigned to the French. Baird won a settlement in the Supreme Court of Newfoundland. In 1898 he was appointed to the Legislative Council of Newfoundland, a position he held for the remainder of his life.

Baird's summer house, known as both Bryn Mawr Cottage and Baird Cottage, was built in 1905 by architect William F. Butler. It burned in an early morning fire in December 2022.

References

External links 
 Biography at the Dictionary of Canadian Biography Online
 James Baird Biography

1828 births
1915 deaths
Members of the Legislative Council of Newfoundland
Scottish emigrants to pre-Confederation Newfoundland
Dominion of Newfoundland people
Newfoundland Colony people